An environmentally sensitive area (ESA) is a type of designation for an agricultural area which needs special protection because of its landscape, wildlife or historical value. The scheme was introduced in 1987.  Originally it was administered by Ministry of Agriculture, Fisheries and Food, then the Rural Development Service for the United Kingdom Governments Department for Environment, Food and Rural Affairs, and currently Natural England following successive re-organisation of the departments. In 2005 the scheme was superseded by Environmental Stewardship and closed to new entrants. Existing agreements remain active until they expire, meaning the designation will remain active until 2014.

Farmers entered into a 10-year contract with the government and received an annual payment for the area that is part of the scheme. Farmers were expected to adopt environmentally friendly agricultural practices.

There are 22 ESAs in England:
Avon Valley
Blackdown Hills
Breckland
Broads
River Clun
Cotswold Hills
Dartmoor
Essex Coast
Exmoor
Lake District
North Kent Marshes
North Peak
Pennine Dales
Shropshire Hills
Somerset Levels and Moors
South Downs
South Wessex Downs
South West Peak
Suffolk River Valleys
Test Valley
Upper Thames Tributaries
West Penwith

There are 10 ESAs in Scotland
Breadalbane
Loch Lomond
Machair (Western Isles)
Stewartry
Central Borders (inc Whitlaw Eildon)
Central Uplands
Western Uplands
Cairngorm Straths
Shetland Islands
Argyll Islands

See also
Countryside Stewardship Scheme
Environmental stewardship
Area of Outstanding Natural Beauty (AONB)
Site of Special Scientific Interest (SSSI)
Special Area of Conservation (SAC)
Special protection area (SPA)
Nitrate sensitive area (NSA)

References

Protected areas of the United Kingdom
Env